Mrs. Singha Roy is an Indian Bengali language family drama  television show produced by Shree Venkatesh Films and directed by Partha Sen. The show stars Ishita Ganguly and Laboni Sarkar in lead roles. The show aired at  8:30pm from Monday to Friday on Sananda TV.

Plot
The duplicitous Damayanti Singha Roy saves distressed women through her non-governmental organization. A poor woman, Saraswati Mondal marries into the family and the series follows her as she interacts with hostile members of her new family.

Cast
Ishita Ganguly as Saraswati Mondal Singha Roy
Laboni Sarkar as Damayanti Singha Roy
Rajat Ganguly
Debdut Ghosh
Joyjit Banerjee 
Piyali Munshi
Barun Chakraborty as Biswanath Mondal
Moushumi Saha

References

Bengali-language television programming in India
Indian television series